Giacomo Mignanelli (died 1576) was a Roman Catholic prelate who served as Bishop of Grosseto (1553–1576).

Biography
On 2 October 1553, Giacomo Mignanelli was appointed during the papacy of Pope Julius III as Bishop of Grosseto.
He served as Bishop of Grosseto until his death in 1576.

References

External links and additional sources
 (for Chronology of Bishops) 
 (for Chronology of Bishops)  

16th-century Italian Roman Catholic bishops
Bishops appointed by Pope Julius III
Bishops of Grosseto
1576 deaths